Gnesiomyia is a genus of flies in the family Stratiomyidae.

Distribution
Java.

Species
Gnesiomyia crassiseta (Meijere, 1911)

References

Stratiomyidae
Brachycera genera
Taxa named by Kálmán Kertész
Diptera of Asia
Endemic fauna of Java